The Minneapolis Millerettes were an expansion All-American Girls Professional Baseball League team that played for one season in 1944 based in Minneapolis, Minnesota. The Millerettes played home games at Nicollet Park, home of the men's minor league baseball team the Minneapolis Millers.

History
The Millerettes' uniform consisted of a maroon cap and socks and a pink dress uniform with the circular Minneapolis city seal at the center of the chest.

Like their expansion counterparts the Milwaukee Chicks, the team did not have an official nickname.  They were alternately known as "Millerettes", after the city's American Association ballclub, and "Lakers" from Minnesota's nickname, "Land of 10,000 Lakes".  That nickname would be adopted by the city's professional basketball team three years later.  Halfway through the season, the league gave up on the Minneapolis market and the Millerettes became a traveling team playing all games on the road, earning another nickname, the "Orphans".

The team was managed by Bubber Jonnard, and finished 26 and a half games out of first place, with a  45–72 record.

The most significant players were pitcher Dorothy Wiltse, who posted a 20–16 record and a 1.88 ERA in 38 appearances, and outfielder Helen Callaghan, who finished second in the league in average (.287) and third in runs (81), hits (114), home runs (3), and total bases (136). Pitcher Annabelle Lee threw the first perfect game in AAGPBL history on July 29, 1944, against the Kenosha Comets.

The following year, the Millerettes moved to Fort Wayne, Indiana, where they became the Fort Wayne Daisies.

All-time players roster

Kay Blumetta
Lorraine Borg
Helen Callaghan
Margaret Callaghan
Faye Dancer
Julie Dusanko
Loretta Dwojak
Elizabeth Farrow
Edna Frank
Audrey Haine
Lillian Jackson
Marguerite Jones
Vivian Kellogg
Audrey Kissel
Annabelle Lee
Ruth Lessing
Elizabeth Mahon
Anna Meyer
Lavonne Paire
Irene Ruhnke
Lorraine Torrison
Betty Trezza
Margaret Wigiser
Dorothy Wiltse

References

Sources
All-American Girls Professional Baseball League history
All-American Girls Professional Baseball League official website – 1944 Minneapolis Millerettes season
AAGPBL Official Website – 1944 Minneapolis Millerettes image
All-American Girls Professional Baseball League official website – Manager/Player profile search results
All-American Girls Professional Baseball League Record Book – W. C. Madden. Publisher: McFarland & Company, 2000. Format: Hardcover, 294pp. Language: English. 
Women at Play: The Story of Women in Baseball – Barbara Gregorich. Publisher: Harcourt Brace and Company, 1993. Format:  Softcover, 214 pp. Language: English. 
The Women of the All-American Girls Professional Baseball League: A Biographical Dictionary – W. C. Madden. Publisher:  McFarland & Company, 2005. Format: Softcover, 295 pp. Language: English. 

All-American Girls Professional Baseball League teams
1944 establishments in Minnesota
1944 disestablishments in Minnesota
Baseball teams established in 1944
Baseball teams disestablished in 1944
Sports in Minneapolis
Professional baseball teams in Minnesota
Defunct baseball teams in Minnesota
Women's sports in Minnesota